Durocher  is a surname. Notable people with the surname include: 

 Eulalie Durocher (1811–1849), Canadian nun and candidate for sainthood
 Jean-Baptiste Durocher (1754–1811), Canadian businessman and politician
 Joseph Marie Elisabeth Durocher (1817–1860), French geologist
 Leo Durocher (1905–1991), American baseball player and manager
 Marie Durocher (1809–1893), Brazilian doctor
 Olivier Durocher (1844–1931), Canadian politician from Ontario
 Olivier Durocher (Quebec politician) (1743–1821), Canadian politician from Quebec

See also
Durocher, Haiti is a village in the Dame-Marie commune of Haiti